The Midland Railway 1102 Class was a class of 0-6-0T steam locomotives. Twenty-five were built by Neilson and Company in 1874–75 (Nos. 1102–1126) and fifteen by Vulcan Foundry in 1875–76 (Nos. 1127–1141).  They were very similar to the subsequent 1377 Class.

The Midland 1907 numbers were 1620–1659. All except No. 1628 were inherited by the LMS in 1923. They were all withdrawn by 1932, and none have been preserved.

References 

 
 An Illustrated Review of Midland Locomotives Volume 3 - Tank Engines by R. J. Essery & D. Jenkinson 

0-6-0T locomotives
1102 Class